Petualangan Sherina (English: Sherina’s Adventure) is an Indonesian musical adventure comedy film released in 2000. It was directed by Riri Riza and stars Sherina Munaf, Derby Romero, Didi Petet, Mathias Muchus, Ratna Riantiarno, and Butet Kertaradjasa. The screenplay was written by Jujur Prananto, with music arranged by Elfa Secioria.

Plot
Sherina is a girl who is smart, energetic, and loves to sing. She lives in Jakarta with her parents, the Darmawans (Mathias Muchus and Ucy Nurul). However, Sherina has to leave her friends when her father accepts a job as an agronomist, at a plantation in Lembang owned by Ardiwilaga (Didi Petet). In her new environment, she quickly adapts and acquires some new friends. However, she becomes the target of the class bullies, consisting of a boy named Sadam (Derby Romero) and his two friends. They often bother children who are weaker. Sherina cannot accept such treatment and she gathers her classmates in a struggle against Sadam. When she accompanies his father to visit the plantation, she discovers that Sadam is Ardiwilaga's son.

Sherina and Sadam challenge each other to climb the nearby hills and, upon arriving, Sadam attempts to leave Sherina behind. She tries to find her way back to the plantation and stumbles across an adult man. After convincing her that he has found Sadam, they go to a car where another man is waiting. As they gesture for Sherina to get into their car, Sherina hears Sadam's muffled voice from inside its boot telling her to get away. She escapes and, when the four kidnappers leave, she follows them. She discovers that they have been tasked with kidnapping Sadam by a cunning businessman named Kertarajasa (Djaduk Ferianto), who wishes to buy the plantation to complete their development project.

When the kidnappers try to call Ardiwilaga, they reach his wife (Ratna Riantiarno) and tell her to prepare a 3 billion rupiah ransom. She agrees to this condition and convinces her husband to sell the land to Natasya (Henidar Amroe), who had offered them 2 billion the day before. Later, at the kidnappers' hideout, Sherina is able to rescue Sadam while the guards are sleeping. They take documentation connecting the thugs to Kertarajasa and escape to a nearby observatory, where they spend the night. In Jakarta, Kertarajasa dances with his wife, revealed to be Natasya, and states that he will launch his project the following day once the plantation is legally his.

In the morning Sadam is desperately ill. Sherina tries to leave the observatory through the front door only to discover that it had been locked and the kidnappers were outside. With Sadam's help she rappels down the observatory wall and outruns two of the kidnappers, making her way to a nearby village and catching a ride to Ardiwilaga's home; Sadam, however, is captured. Sherina arrives just as he is preparing to sign the land deed over to Natasya and reveals Kertarajasa's plans. Police quickly arrest Natasya and Kertarajasa, and when the kidnappers try to collect their ransom they too are arrested. When Sherina and Sadam return to school after the holiday they are friends, and Sadam agrees to stop bullying his peers.

Cast
Sherina Munaf as Sherina
Derby Romero as Sadam
Rodo Purba provides Sadam's singing voice.
Mathias Muchus as Mr. Darmawan (Sherina's Father)
Ucy Nurul as Sherina's Mother
Didi Petet as Mr. Ardiwilaga (Sadam's Father)
Ratna Riantiarno as Sadam's Mother
Butet Kertaradjasa as Pak Raden 
Henidar Amroe as Natasya
Djaduk Ferianto as Kertarajasa
Dewi Hughes as Teacher
 Alyssa Soebandono as Friend Sherina

Production
Sherina was directed by Riri Riza and Mira Lesmana and was produced by Miles Production. The film was planned to cost Rp 1.3 billion (US$180,000), but went over budget and eventually cost Rp 2 billion (US$250,000). The filming was conducted from November to December 1999. In this film, Elfa Secioria composed the film's soundtrack Lihatlah Lebih Dekat (Take a Closer Look), which is also Sherina's second album, while Lesmana wrote the lyrics for eight songs. Lesmana said that ideas and inspirations came from The Sound of Music and Grease.

Style and themes
Sherina deals with themes of friendship, children, environment and family relationships, as well as coping with the entertainment business. According to a review by The Jakarta Post the storyline is easily understood by all, including children from all levels of society. The review states that the film boasts fine graphic quality, smooth camerawork, neatly constructed scenes and attractive cinematography, especially shots of mountains, forests and landscapes. This was reminiscent of several Indonesian films from the 1950s to 1970s, including Si Pintjang (The Lame; 1951), Jenderal Kancil (General Deer-mouse; 1958), Bintang Kecil (Little Star; 1963), and Rio Anakku (Rio, My Son; 1973).

Release and reception
Sherina premiered on 7 June 2000, and received wide release on 14 June 2000. Yan Wijaya, writing in The Jakarta Post, said that the film was like a breath of fresh air wafting through the stale Indonesian movie world. Leila S. Chudori, in a review for Tempo Magazine, wrote that the music for the film was interesting and easy to listen to, with brilliant visualization, but the editing is rather chaotic, and the children's choreography is weak.

The film was watched by over 1.1 million people, and earned Rp 10 billion (US$1.2 million).

Sequel 
A sequel, Petualangan Sherina 2, was announced in 2020. Munaf and Romero will reprise their roles. It is initially scheduled to be released in 2021, but was then delayed to 2022 due to COVID-19.

Adaptations

Animation 
In 2020, an animated adaptation was announced.

Musical 
In 2017, the Jakarta Movement of Inspiration staged a musical adaptation of the film. It was again performed in 2021 and 2022.

Awards
Petualangan Sherina received a special jury prize at the 2000 Asia Pacific Film Festival. The following year it won Best Children's Film at the Bandung Film Festival. At the 2004 Indonesian Film Festival, the first in over a decade, the film received three nominations for a Citra Award but saw no wins.

References

External links

2000 films
2000 comedy films
2000s musical comedy films
2000s Indonesian-language films
Indonesian musical comedy films
Indonesian children's films
Films directed by Riri Riza